Lee Hsin-han and Peng Hsien-yin were the defending champions but decided not to participate.

Kudla and Uchiyama won the title, defeating Daniel Kosakowski and Nicolas Meister in the final, 6–3, 6–2.

Seeds

Draw

Draw

References
 Main Draw

Royal Lahaina Challenger - Doubles
2014 Doubles